King Wadada, also known as Austin Peter, (born on 6 August 1975) is a Nigerian reggae musician, singer, and songwriter.  He won the Kora Awards in 2010 as Africa's best reggae artist of the year. He is best known for his song "Holy Holy."

Early life
King Wadada was born on 6 August 1975 in Urhonigbe, in the Orhionmwon local government area of Edo State in Nigeria.

Career
King Wadada, was signed to Miracle Day Music. He won the Kora Awards as Africa's best reggae artist of the year in 2010.

References

Nigerian male musicians
Living people
English-language singers from Nigeria
1975 births
21st-century Nigerian male singers